Emil Batch (January 21, 1880 – August 23, 1926) was a professional baseball player who played  third base and outfielder from 1904 to 1907 for the Brooklyn Superbas.

External links

1880 births
1926 deaths
Major League Baseball third basemen
Major League Baseball outfielders
Brooklyn Superbas players
Sportspeople from Brooklyn
Baseball players from New York City
Waterbury Rough Riders players
Holyoke Paperweights players
Rochester Bronchos players
Rochester Hustlers players
Binghamton Bingoes players
Bridgeport Crossmen players
Burials at the Cemetery of the Evergreens